Mat(t)hew or Matt Evans may refer to:

 Mathew Evans, Canadian inventor
 Matt Evans (born 1986), Filipino actor
 Matt Evans (rugby union) (born 1988), Canadian rugby union player 
 Matthew Evans, Baron Evans of Temple Guiting (1941–2016), British Labour Party politician
 Matthew Rhys (born 1974), stage name used by Welsh actor born Matthew Evans
 Matthew Evans (cricketer) (born 1974), former English cricketer
 Matthew Evans, front man of the band Murry the Hump